Brian Keith Harvey (born 1949) is a former Lecturer SOE of computer science at University of California, Berkeley. He and his students developed an educational programming language named UCBLogo which is free and open-source software, a dialect of the language Logo, as an interpreter, for learners.

Education
He received his B.S. in mathematics at Massachusetts Institute of Technology (MIT), 1969, a M.S. in computer science, Stanford University, 1975, and a Ph.D. in science and mathematics education, University of California, Berkeley, 1985. He also received a M.A. in clinical psychology, New College of California, 1990.

Work
Until retiring in July 2013, Harvey taught introductory (lower-division) computer science courses at Berkeley, and CS 195, Social Implications of Computing. He was also involved in the development of the language Logo for the use in K-12 education.

Together with the German programmer Jens Mönig, Harvey designed the programming language Build Your Own Blocks (BYOB), and its successor Snap!, an extended version of the language Scratch, which added higher-order functions and true object-oriented inheritance for first-class sprites. With CS10, The Beauty and Joy of Computing at Berkeley he co-established the first course to use BYOB and spread it to other colleges and high schools.

Selected publications

References

External links
 , UC Berkeley
 CS 61A (The Structure and Interpretation of Computer Programs) Webcasts

American computer scientists
Massachusetts Institute of Technology School of Science alumni
Stanford University alumni
UC Berkeley College of Engineering faculty
New College of California alumni
University of California, Berkeley alumni
Living people
1949 births